Júlio César da Silva (born 8 March 1963), usually known as Júlio César, is a Brazilian former professional footballer who played as a centre-back. Throughout his career, he played with multiple teams in Brazil and Europe, and also represented the Brazil national team at the 1986 FIFA World Cup, and at the 1987 Copa América.

Club career 
Born in Bauru, São Paulo, Júlio César began his career in 1979 with Brazilian club Guarani. He moved to Europe in 1986, after a successful World Cup in Mexico, spending a season with French club Stade Brestois. The following season, he played for Montpellier, where he remained for three seasons, winning the Coupe de France during his final season with the team.

He moved to Italian club Juventus in 1990, in an attempt to strengthen the club's fragile defence, making his Serie A debut on 9 September 1990, in a 2–1 away win over Parma. He remained in Turin until 1994, although, despite some solid performances, his time with the club was largely unsuccessful; his only trophy with Juventus was the UEFA Cup, which he won in 1993, under Giovanni Trapattoni. In total, he made 125 appearances for Juventus, scoring six goals, two of which came in European Competitions, and three of which came during his 91 Serie A appearances.

In 1994, he was purchased by German club Borussia Dortmund, where he immediately won consecutive Bundesliga and DFL-Supercup titles, during his first two seasons with the team, as well as the UEFA Champions League and the Intercontinental Cup in 1997 (though he missed the final of the former through injury). He remained with the club until 1999, apart from loans to Brazilian club Botafogo in 1998, and Greek club Panathinaikos in 1999. Later that year, he joined Werder Bremen for the 1999–2000 Bundesliga season, before moving back to Brazil once again, to play for Rio Branco, in 2001, where he retired.

International career
Júlio César played 13 official matches for the Brazil national team, from April 1986 to June 1993; he made his debut on 8 April 1986, in a 3–0 home win over East Germany. He also played for Brazil against "The Rest of the World" in 1989 and for "The Rest of the World" against Brazil in 1990.

He played for Brazil at the 1986 FIFA World Cup in Mexico and won the Best Central Defender Award, being elected to the team of the tournament. However, his outstanding performance in the tournament was tempered by his penalty miss against France in the memorable quarter-final in Guadalajara. With the penalty-shootout tied at 3–3, after Michel Platini's had infamously shot his spot kick over the bar, Cesar stepped up for Brazil only to see his powerful effort crash against the left post. Luis Fernández converted the next penalty and subsequently won the match for France. The following year, he also represented his country at the 1987 Copa América.

Style of play
Widely considered to be one of Brazil's best centre-backs, Júlio César was known for his physical strength, speed, and aerial ability, as well as his positioning, tackling, and adeptness at reading the game. A quick, versatile, and powerful defender, with good feet, vision, and passing range, he was also capable of playing as a sweeper, a position which allowed him to contribute to his teams' attacks, and make runs into the opponent's half, where he used his aerial prowess, as well as his midfield-like elegance on the ball and technical skills, to great effect; he was also an accurate set-piece and penalty kick taker, possessing a powerful shot from distance, which made him an additional offensive threat.

Career statistics

Club

International

Honours
Montpellier
 Coupe de France: 1989–90

Juventus
 UEFA Cup : 1992–93

Borussia Dortmund
 Bundesliga; 1994–95, 1995–96
 UEFA Champions League: 1996–97 
 Intercontinental Cup: 1997
 DFL-Supercup: 1995

Individual
 FIFA World Cup All-Star Team: 1986
 kicker'' Bundesliga-best defender: 1995
 FIFA XI: 1999

References

External links
 
 

1963 births
Living people
People from Bauru
Brazilian footballers
Association football central defenders
Brazil international footballers
Brazil under-20 international footballers
1986 FIFA World Cup players
1987 Copa América players
Campeonato Brasileiro Série A players
Campeonato Brasileiro Série B players
Campeonato Brasileiro Série C players
Ligue 1 players
Serie A players
Super League Greece players
Bundesliga players
Guarani FC players
Stade Brestois 29 players
Montpellier HSC players
Juventus F.C. players
Borussia Dortmund players
Botafogo de Futebol e Regatas players
SV Werder Bremen players
Panathinaikos F.C. players
UEFA Cup winning players
Brazilian expatriate footballers
Brazilian expatriate sportspeople in France
Expatriate footballers in France
Brazilian expatriate sportspeople in Italy
Expatriate footballers in Italy
Brazilian expatriate sportspeople in Germany
Expatriate footballers in Germany
Brazilian expatriate sportspeople in Greece
Expatriate footballers in Greece
Footballers from São Paulo (state)